Rabia (Arabic: ربيعة) is a town in the north-west of Iraq, near the border crossing to the town of Al-Yarubiyah in Syria. Both towns are inhabited by the Shammar Arab tribe. Rabia is located on the road between Al-Shaddadah in Syria and Mosul in Iraq. 

The town's primary economic sector is illegal smuggling, though there are legitimate freight and human migration between Syria and Iraq. Migrants are scanned using retina scanning technology.

In August 2003, Syria inaugurated the Rabia railway station. It was announced that there would be two goods' trains a week, with a passenger service to follow.  As of October 2009, the passenger train was arriving at the Rabiyah station on Wednesday afternoons in the direction of Damascus and on Saturday mornings in the direction of Mosul.

The standard gauge railway line from Rabia, part of the Baghdad Railway, is linked to Baghdad via Mosul. 

The border crossing was redesigned during the Iraq troop surge operation in 2008 and subsequently attacked by an individual wearing a suicide vest. The explosion destroyed a building used for processing personnel through the crossing point, damaged several other buildings, and caused several casualties, including a civilian contractor working for the U.S. military forces there.  

The town was previously controlled by Peshmerga forces from June 2014 until October 2017.

During the Syrian civil war (October, 2014) Western newspapermen reported on fighting at Rabia between jihadists and Kurdish Peshmerga.

References

External links 
 

Populated places in Nineveh Governorate
Iraq–Syria border crossings